Raymond Gafner (February 17, 1915 – November 26, 2002) was an ice hockey player, referee, and a member of the IOC between 1969 and 1990.

Biography
Raymond Gafner was born in Lausanne, Switzerland in 1915. From 1931 on, he studied Law, after which he was director of the local hospital from 1954 until 1974 and of the university hospital until 1980. From 1942 until 1950, he was the chief scout of Lausanne and Switzerland's biggest scout group "La Brigade de Sauvabelin". He was a hockey and ice hockey goaltender in the premier Swiss league and later an international ice hockey referee, and was the president of the Swiss Ice Hockey Federation from 1945 until 1951, celebrating the bronze medal at the World Championships in 1950. He became a member of the Swiss Olympic Committee in 1947 and was the president of the Committee from 1965 until 1985. He was a member of the International Olympic Committee from 1969 until 1990, when he became an honorary member, and is one of the founders of the Olympic Museum in Lausanne in 1993. He died in 2002 after a prolonged disease.

Raymond Gafner was also known as a writer, publishing 6 sport related books between 1983 and 1993.

Awards
1983: Credit Suisse Sports Award (main Swiss sports Award, six categories each year)
1983: Prix du Mérite sportif lausannois (Twoyearly sports award of the city of Lausanne)
1992: Flambeau d'Or des PCI (Four-yearly award of the International Panathlon organisation)
 1999: The Pierre de Coubertin Medal (highest award of the IOC) "pays tribute to those who, through their teaching, research and writing of Intellectual works, have contributed to the promotion of Olympism in the spirit of Pierre de Coubertin"

Notes and references

External links
 Report of the 114th IOC session, with in memoriam for Gafner

1915 births
2002 deaths
Recipients of the Pierre de Coubertin medal
International Olympic Committee members
Swiss ice hockey goaltenders
FC Lausanne-Sport
Sportspeople from Lausanne